Vimaanam is a 2017 Indian Malayalam-language drama film written and directed by debutant Pradeep M. Nair, and starring Prithviraj Sukumaran and Durga Krishna. The film was released on 22 December 2017.

This film is said to be loosely based on the life of Saji Thomas, who can neither hear nor speak, but designed and built a lightweight aircraft.

Plot
 
Venkidi  is a school drop out because he was bullied in school for his use of "hearing aid". He becomes interested in aeronautics as he is introduced to the story of Wright brothers in school. As he grows up, he falls in love with Janaki, his best friend and inspiration for his dreams. Finally Venkidi succeeds in his goal to make an aircraft by himself and flies it above his village. Everyone who used to laugh at Venkidi for his obsession with the making of aircraft are now speechless and impressed. Janaki's father finds out that Venkidi stole his car for finding a suitable engine for his aircraft and gets him arrested. In the meantime Janaki is forcefully sent to Singapore to her relatives for higher studies with the understanding that she will be married off to their son Ananthan. The story ends as old Venkidi, now a Padma award winner for his achievements, meets the widowed Janaki and her daughter who have come to India to meet him. They fulfill their dream to fly together in Venkidi's old aircraft he made years ago in his village.

Cast
 Prithviraj Sukumaran as Venkidi
 Durga Krishna as Janaki
 Alencier Ley Lopez as Roger
 Saiju Kurup as Ananthan 
 Lena as Daisy
 P. Balachandran as Priest 
 Anarkali Marikar as Gouri, Janaki's daughter
 Sudheer Karamana as Murugan
 Liya Anu as Radha
 Baby Durga Premjith
 Dheepa Ramanujam as Venkidi's mother
 Vijilesh Karayad as Venkidi's Friend

Production
Vimaanam is a film involving high VFX works for the flying scenes. The film will have two time periods with Prithviraj appearing in two different looks. Reportedly, he will be reducing weight for the role and will also be taking flying courses.

Principal photography commenced on 9 February 2017 in Kochi, Kerala. The main filming locations was Bhatkal and Mangalore, and was also shot in Delhi, Mysore, and Thiruvananthapuram.
Vimaanam is loosely based on the life of Saji Thomas, who could neither hear nor speak but who designed and built his own ultralight aircraft. Two film has been released about Mr. Thomas biography, other one was titled Aby

Music
The music was composed by Gopi Sunder. Lyrics were by Rafeeq Ahamed

References

External links
 
 

2017 films
Indian aviation films
Films shot in Thiruvananthapuram
Films shot in Mangalore
Films shot in Mysore
Films shot in Karnataka
Films shot in Delhi
2010s Malayalam-language films